Uğur İnceman (born 25 May 1981) is a former professional footballer who played as a midfielder. Born in Germany, he represented the Turkey national team.

Club career
İnceman was born in Aachen, West Germany. His childhood nickname is Iceman. He is good friends with former player Vikash Dhorasoo.

In 2008 Beşiktaş paid Manisaspor $1,750,000 plus two players in exchange for İnceman. He played 40 league games for Beşiktaş where he scored 3 goals. In one and a half seasons with Konyaspor between 2014 and 2015, İnceman played in 36 Süper Lig encounters, scoring two goals and assisting for another two.

At 34 years of age, he joined Roda JC  on 7 January 2015.

International career
İnceman earned his first and only senior cap for Turkey in an friendly game away against Denmark, ended 1–0 for Denmark, on 18 February 2004.

Style of play
İnceman was known for his mental attributes such as his anticipation to read the game on the pitch and his creativity specially on passes through the opponents' defences.

References

External links
 Profile at TFF
 

1981 births
Living people
German people of Turkish descent
German people of Circassian descent
Turkish people of Circassian descent
Sportspeople from Aachen
Association football midfielders
Turkish footballers
German footballers
Footballers from North Rhine-Westphalia
Turkey international footballers
Turkey B international footballers
Turkey under-21 international footballers
Turkey youth international footballers
Alemannia Aachen players
FC St. Pauli players
SpVgg Greuther Fürth players
Manisaspor footballers
Beşiktaş J.K. footballers
Antalyaspor footballers
Roda JC Kerkrade players
Süper Lig players
Bundesliga players
2. Bundesliga players
Eredivisie players
Turkish expatriate footballers
German expatriate footballers
Turkish expatriate sportspeople in the Netherlands
German expatriate sportspeople in the Netherlands
Expatriate footballers in the Netherlands
German expatriate sportspeople in Turkey
Expatriate footballers in Turkey